The German term Neubaulokomotive specifically refers to those steam locomotives which were newly designed and built, either for the Deutsche Bundesbahn in West Germany or the Deutsche Reichsbahn in East Germany, after the Second World War.

Concept
The term Neubaulokomotive or Neubaulok was chosen to distinguish these locomotives from the standard steam locomotives built by the pre-war Deutsche Reichsbahn in Germany, the so-called Einheitsdampflokomotiven or Einheitsloks. 

The main differences were the welded plate frames instead of bar frames and more powerful boilers with combustion chambers. The locomotives which were newly developed by the Bundesbahn stand out visually from their Reichsbahn and former state railway (Länderbahnen) counterparts, particularly because of their shiny, silver-coloured boiler rings.

DB locomotives
The DB  Neubauloks were:

Class 10
Class 23
Class 65
Class 66
Class 82

DR locomotives
The  Neubauloks of the former Deutsche Reichsbahn in the GDR were:

Class 23.10
Class 25.10
Class 50.40
Class 65.10
Class 83.10
Class 99.23-24
Class 99.77-79

See also
List of DB locomotives and railbuses
List of East German Deutsche Reichsbahn locomotives and railbuses
Einheitsdampflokomotive
Kriegslokomotive
Rekolokomotive

References

External links 
 Steam locomotive construction and technology (German)

Steam locomotive types
Steam locomotives of Germany
Deutsche Bundesbahn locomotives
Deutsche Reichsbahn (East Germany) locomotives